Frank Edward Wilson (11 April 1924 – 24 October 2005) was an Australian film, stage and television actor; musical comedy singer and director; and television game show and variety host.

Early life
Frank Wilson was born in 1924 in the Melbourne suburb of Northcote.  He left school at the age of 13.  In 1943, he joined the Australian Army, where he served as a Signalman in Borneo and Papua New Guinea until his discharge in 1945.

He began acting in 1948, when he appeared at Melbourne's Tivoli Theatre.

Career
His best-known film appearances were in The Club (by David Williamson; a role that Wilson had created on stage), Crackerjack, Breaker Morant, Black Robe and Money Movers. On television he appeared in Changi (a mini-series written by John Doyle), SeaChange, Blue Heelers, Water Rats, Power Without Glory, A Country Practice, Bellbird, Doctor Down Under and other programs.

His stage work included Guys and Dolls, Wonderful Town, Lola Montez, Damn Yankees, How to Succeed in Business Without Really Trying (which he directed), and as Falstaff in Shakespeare's Henry IV, Part 2.

David Williamson wrote the character of Frank in Travelling North for Wilson, having admired his interpretation of Jock Riley in The Club.  However, after creating Frank on stage, Wilson was not given the role in the film adaptation — it went to Leo McKern instead.

Awards
He won a Logie Award for Best Compere in 1972 for New Faces.

His last role, in the short film The Chess Set (by Alexander Murawski) won the Best Actor award at the New York International Independent Film and Video Festival.  Wilson heard this news the day before he died.

Family
Wilson and his wife Beryl had 4 children: Amanda, Damien (dec), Matthew and Shauna. Matthew and Shauna went on to become child actors. He had 7 grandchildren.

Select credits
Cobwebs in Concrete (1968)

References

Frank Wilson at Filmbug

1924 births
2005 deaths
Deaths from diabetes
Australian male film actors
Australian game show hosts
Australian male stage actors
Australian male television actors
Australian Army personnel of World War II
Australian Army soldiers
Male actors from Melbourne
People from Northcote, Victoria
Military personnel from Melbourne
Television personalities from Melbourne